Walter Naneder (born 27 April 1978) is an Argentine rower. He competed in the men's coxless pair event at the 2004 Summer Olympics.

References

External links
 

1978 births
Living people
Argentine male rowers
Olympic rowers of Argentina
Rowers at the 2004 Summer Olympics
Rowers from Buenos Aires
Pan American Games medalists in rowing
Pan American Games gold medalists for Argentina
Rowers at the 2003 Pan American Games